Hogan Creek is a stream in the U.S. state of Indiana. It is a tributary to the Ohio River.

Hogan Creek was named after the two Hogan brothers, pioneer settlers who were both killed by Indians.

References

Rivers of Indiana
Rivers of Dearborn County, Indiana
Tributaries of the Ohio River